Runcinia bifrons is a species of spiders of the genus Runcinia. It is native to India, Sri Lanka and Vietnam.

References

Spiders described in 1895
Thomisidae
Arthropods of India
Spiders of Asia